Mario Ariosa (September 12, 1920 – January 20, 1992) was a Cuban outfielder who played in the American Negro leagues in 1947.

A native of Remedios, Cuba, Ariosa played a single season in the Negro leagues as a member of the New York Cubans during their 1947 Negro World Series championship campaign. He went on to play and manage for many seasons in the Mexican League, and is a member of the Mexican Professional Baseball Hall of Fame. Ariosa died in 1992 at age 71.

References

External links
 and  Seamheads 

1920 births
1992 deaths
Diablos Rojos del México players
Mexican Baseball Hall of Fame inductees
New York Cubans players
Cuban expatriate baseball players in Mexico
Cuban expatriate baseball players in the United States
Angeles de Puebla players
Bravos de León players
Petroleros de Poza Rica players
Piratas de Campeche players
Rojos del Águila de Veracruz players
Baseball outfielders
People from Remedios, Cuba